Capeserod (INN; development code SL65.0155) is a selective 5-HT4 receptor partial agonist with Ki = 0.6 nM and IA = 40–50% (relative to serotonin). It potently enhances cognition, learning, and memory, and also possesses antidepressant effects. Capeserod was in phase II clinical trials around 2004–2006 for the treatment of memory deficits and dementia but no new information has surfaced since and it appears to have been abandoned.

See also 
 RS-67,333

References 

Abandoned drugs
Benzodioxans
Carbamates
Chloroarenes
Lactams
Oxadiazoles
Piperidines